Jan Kochanowski University in Kielce, formerly the Holy Cross Academy and the Jan Kochanowski University of Humanities and Sciences; is a public university in Kielce, Holy Cross Province. It is named after Jan Kochanowski, and was established in 1945, dating its tradition to an educational institution, specialising in pedagogy.

References

External links
  Official homepage

As from October 1, 2011, the University's name is The Jan Kochanowski University (cf. the Polish version).

Kielce
Universities and colleges in Poland